Tanja Hüberli (born 27 August 1992) is a Swiss beach volleyball player. She competed in the 2020 Summer Olympics.

References

External links
 
 
 
 

1992 births
Living people
Sportspeople from Bern
People from Thalwil
Beach volleyball players at the 2020 Summer Olympics
Swiss beach volleyball players
Olympic beach volleyball players of Switzerland